Who Are You: School 2015 (also known in Japan as Love Generation) is a South Korean television series, starring Kim So-hyun, Nam Joo-hyuk, and Yook Sung-jae. It aired on KBS2 from April 27 to June 16, 2015, every Monday and Tuesday at 21:55 KST for 16 episodes. It is the sixth installment of KBS's School series which premiered in 1999.

The final episode received a 8.2% nationwide ratings.  it was well-received and popular overseas,it established a strong following among young viewers worldwide which led to increased recognition for its cast.

Synopsis
Ko Eun-byeol and Lee Eun-bi (both played by Kim So-hyun) are identical twins, separated after one is adopted at the age of 5. Eun-bi lives at the Love House, an orphanage in Tongyeong, South Gyeongsang Province, where the younger residents look up to her as a mother figure. However, she hides the fact that she is bullied at school by a gang of mean girls led by Kang So-young, while teachers turn a blind eye.

On the other hand, Ko Eun-byeol is studying at Sekang High School, the most prestigious private high school in Seoul's Gangnam District. Eun-byeol's best friend is Han Yi-an (Nam Joo-hyuk), the school's star swimmer and is in love with her since childhood.

However, only Eun-byeol is aware of the other's existence. Unlike the cheerful Eun-bi, Eun-byeol is prickly and secretive.

Cast

Main
 Kim So-hyun as Lee Eun-bi (Go Eun-bi) / Go Eun-byul 
Kang Ji-woo as young Lee Eun-bi (Go Eun-bi) / Go Eun-byul 
Go Eun-byul and Lee Eun-bi are identical twins. Lee Eun-bi lives in an orphanage whereas Go Eun-byul, Eun-bi's twin sister lives with a woman who adopted her. Due to bullying, Eun-bi decided to end her life but she was saved by her twin sister. Eun-bi had amnesia after that. When Eun-byul's adoptive mother mistook Eun-bi as Eun-byul, she starts to assume the identity of her twin sister. Eun-byul leaves in the end to pursue her dreams whilst Eun-bi remains in the school.
 Nam Joo-hyuk as Han Yi-an
Go Woo-rim as young Han Yi-an
A star swimmer at Sekang High School. He was great childhood friends with Go Eun-byul, and had feelings for her. He is loyal to his friends and although from a poor background, works really hard to help his father at the same time to become a national champion in swimming. He starts to question the identity of Eun-byul (who is actually Eun-bi in disguise), but as time goes by, he falls for Eun-bi unknowingly.
Yook Sung-jae as Gong Tae-kwang
Kim Ye-jun as young Gong Tae-kwang
Described by his father an idiotic and problematic child, Gong Tae-kwang is widely known as a troublemaker in school. His father is the director of Sekang High School and his mother is a famous actress, but his classmates don't know about this. He is portrayed as a happy-go-lucky person who just wanted to cause trouble, but behind his smile, he was actually a struggling child with a painful life. He suffered a lot but everything changed when he met Lee Eun-bi and stood by her side, even when Kang So-young decided to make her life hell. He developed one sided feelings for her and confesses to her later on.

Supporting
Class 2–3

 Lee Pil-mo as Kim Joon-seok (homeroom teacher)
He is pricked by his guilty conscience after a massive cover-up involving the death of one of his students. 
 Lee David as Park Min-joon (class president)
An intelligent and hardworking student who is always at the top of his class. Pressured by his study-centric mother to do well, he feels overwhelmed.
 Kim Hee-jung as Cha Song-joo
Go Eun-byul and Lee Shi-jin best friend. She is torn between staying loyal to Eun-byul and accepting So-young's friendship advances. After finding out Lee Eun-bi's real identity she also became best friends with her.
 Lee Cho-hee as Lee Shi-jin
She is best friends with Go Eun-byul and Cha Sung-joo. She is jealous of her friends who seem to have a passion and tries to seek out one of her own. After finding out Lee Eun-bi's real identity she also became best friends with her.
 Cho Soo-hyang as Kang So-young 
A school bully who found pleasure in bullying Eun-bi. Her transfer to Eun-byul's school soon leads to mistrust and problems between the students. 
 Park Doo-shik as Kwon Ki-tae
 Lee Hwa-kyum as Jo Hae-na
 Jang In-sub as Sung Yoon-jae
 Kim Bo-ra as Seo Young-eun 
 Kim Min-seok as Min-suk
 Choi Hyo-eun as Hyo-eun
 Lee Jin-kwon as Jin-kwon
 Ji Ha-yoon as Ha-yoon
 Park Ah-sung as Ah-sung 
 Seo Cho-won as Cho-won
 Jo Byeong-kyu as Byung-gyu 
 Kwon Eun-soo as Eun-soo
 Oh Woo-jin as Woo-jin
 Jung Ye-ji as Ye-ji 
 Lee Seung-ho as Seung-ho
 Han Sung-yun as Sung-yeon

Sekang High School faculty

 Lee Hee-do as Vice principal
 Shin Jung-geun as Dean of students
 Jung Soo-young as Ahn Ju-ri
 Lee Si-won as Jung Min-young
 Choi Dae-chul as Swimming coach
 Kim Jin-yi as Health teacher

Parents

 Jeon Mi-seon as Song Mi-kyung (Eun-byul's adoptive mother and later Eun-bi's)
 Jeon No-min as Director Gong Jae-ho (Tae-kwang's father)
 Jung In-gi as Park Joon-hyung (Min-joon's father)
 Kim Jung-nan as Shin Jung-min (Min-joon's mother)
 Kim Se-ah as Shin Yi-young (Shi-jin's mother)
 Oh Yoon-hong as Min-young and In-soo's mother
 Jo Deok-hyun as Prosecutor Kang (So-young's father)
 Jung Jae-eun as So-young's mother
 Lee Dae-yeon as Han Ki-choon (Yi-ahn's father)

Extended

 Yang Hee-kyung as Park Min-kyung (House of Love administrator)
 Oh Hee-joon as Food delivery man
 Lee Kang-min as Han Yi-an's swimming senior (episode 2, 4–5, 11, 16)
 Yoo Se-hyung as Han Yi-an's swimming senior (episode 2, 4–5, 11, 16)
 Yoo Yeon-mi as Yeon Mi-joo (episode 5–7, 12)

Special appearances

 Lee Hyun-kyung as Nuri High School teacher (episode 1)
 Lee Jae-in as Ra-jin (episodes 1, 5, 14)
 Shin Seung-joon & Lee Ho-geun as announcers (episode 1)
 Park Young-soo as noraebang owner (episode 2)
 Park Hwan-hee as Kim Kyung-jin (Eun-bi's bully; episode 1)
 Kim Min-young as Lee Soo-mi (Eun-bi's bully; episodes 1, 4–6)
 Lee Jung-eun as Seo Young-eun's mother (episodes 2–3)
 Choi Su-rin as Song Hee-young (Tae-kwang's mother; episode 4, 12, 14)
 Jung In-seo as Jung Soo-In
 Yum Gyung-hwan (episode 6)
 Kim Ga-young as school uniform model (episode 6)
 Sam Hammington as Sekang High's new English teacher (episode 15)
 Bae Soo-bin as Sekang High 2–3 class' homeroom teacher (episode 16)
 Kim Min-kyu as a swimmer.

Ratings
 In the table below,  represent the lowest ratings and  represent the highest ratings.
 NR denotes that the drama did not rank in the top 20 daily programs on that date.

Original soundtrack

OST Part 1

OST Part 2

OST Part 3

OST Part 4

OST Part 5

OST Part 6

OST Part 7

OST Part 8

Awards and nominations

Remake
A Thai remake of the series with the title Who Are You was announced by GMMTV during their "New & Next" event last October 15, 2019 featuring Tipnaree Weerawatnodom (Namtan), Perawat Sangpotirat (Krist) and Kay Lertsittichai. Produced by GMMTV and Nar-ra-tor, it premiered on May 2, 2020, on GMM 25 and Line TV.

Notes

References

External links
  
 
 

2015 South Korean television series debuts
Korean Broadcasting System television dramas
Korean-language television shows
South Korean high school television series
South Korean teen dramas
South Korean romance television series
South Korean mystery television series
South Korean television series remade in other languages
2010s teen drama television series
2015 South Korean television series endings
2015 South Korean television seasons
Television series about bullying
Television series about teenagers
Television series by SM Life Design Group